The Malta Gaming Authority (MGA) (formerly the Lotteries and Gaming Authority) (LGA) is the gaming control board of Malta. It regulates most forms of gambling in its territory, including both land-based (casino, amusement and slot machines, betting offices, fantasy sports, and lotteries) and online gambling services including B2C and B2B services.

History
The MGA was established in 2001 to regulate the various sectors of the gaming industry that fall under the MGA's authority, by ensuring fairness transparency to players using gaming services, preventing crime, corruption and money laundering and to protect minor and vulnerable players. 

The MGA was one of the first regulators to offer legislation that regulates the activity of online gambling companies and create a secure atmosphere for players. A comprehensive set of legislation, regulations and directives regulate the industry, starting with Lotteries and Other Games Act, 2001, and Chapters 438 and 400 of the Laws of Malta.

The online gambling sector in Malta has grown tremendously since 2001, with the industry generating over 12% of the country's GDP.

Functions

The MGA deals with:

Protection of minors and vulnerable persons, while promoting responsible gaming in a safe environment.
Licensing and regulation of the gaming operators.
Guidance and cooperation at all stages of the application process.
Protection of player funds, ensuring that all deposits and withdrawals are secure and enforceable.
Ensure the integrity of games and gaming devices, via audits and independent testing facilities to ensure the randomness of results of all games of chance.
Monitoring of licensee activities to ensure compliance.
Safeguarding of player rights, via investigation of complaints concerning the licensees on behalf of the players.
Monitoring of activities to keep gaming free from criminal activities.

The MGA cannot enforce any operator to return stakes that have been voluntary placed and lost in a fair game, but it can provide advice and assistance in enforcing the deposited money and the actual winnings and aids in dispute resolution with players and its licensees when necessary.

In addition, the new gambling law in Malta introduces "a duty of care for operators". The MGA licence holders are expected to monitor players' gambling habits, look for signs of problematic behaviour and intervene when necessary.

The MGA licenses several well-known online gambling companies. The list of current MGA licence holders is provided at the register page.

Structure

The MGA is composed of the following main entities:

Non-Executive Board of Directors, primarily responsible for overseeing the strategic development of the Authority and ensuring that the set policy and strategic objectives are achieved. The Board is also responsible for policy development and overall risk management. Headed by an independent Chairman who may or may not be the CEO of the MGA.
CEO, who is responsible for the overall execution and performance of the MGA functions.
Executive Management Committee, who are delegated tasks by the CEO and are responsible for major functions of the MGA.
Audit Committee, assisting the Board of Directors in ensuring good corporate governance, risk management, oversight of audit/accounting issues and internal controls, while overseeing the accounting and reporting processes and audits.
Supervisory Council, which supervises and reviews the regulatory objectives of the MGA, and is responsible for ensuring the integrity, consistency and development of the regulatory functions of the MGA, while providing oversight and guidance in relation to ongoing regulatory issues, strategic regulation and act as an advisory committee to the Authority’s Board and management.
Fit and Proper Committee, which assesses and determines whether applicants for an MGA Licence are fit and proper persons, especially from a criminal probity aspect, to be granted a gaming licence and be authorised to conduct gaming business activities.

References 

Gambling regulators
Gambling in Malta
Regulation in Malta
Government agencies of Malta